This is a list of superlative Academy Award winners and nominees. This list is current as of the 94th Academy Awards ceremony.

Best Picture

Best Director

Best Original Screenplay

Best Actor in a Leading Role

Best Actress in a Leading Role

Best Actor in a Supporting Role

Best Actress in a Supporting Role

Combined Academy Awards for Best Actor in a Leading Role and Best Actor in a Supporting Role

Combined Academy Awards for Best Actress in a Leading Role and Best Actress in a Supporting Role

Note: Walt Disney is the highest-earning individual with wins and nominations in any category in the Academy Awards, with fifty-nine nominations and twenty-two Oscar wins (as well as four Honorary Awards), including a record four in one year.

Performances of the same character 
Nominated performances of the same character by different actors or in different films.

See also 

 List of Academy Award records
 List of oldest and youngest Academy Award winners and nominees

External links 

 Oscars.org Official site
 Complete Downloadable List of Academy Award Nominees

Superlatives
Academy Awards